Irene Browne (29 June 1896 – 24 July 1965) was an English stage and film actress and singer who appeared in plays and musicals including No, No, Nanette.  Later in her career, she became particularly associated with the works of Noël Coward and acted in films.

Career
Irene Browne was born in London, England. She began her theatrical career in 1910 as a dancer in H.B. Irving's company and soon graduated to dramatic roles, appearing in J. Comyns Carr's dramatisation of Dr Jekyll and Mr Hyde the following year. For three years, she acted in Australia (The Times mistook her for Australian in 1915).

After returning to London, Browne played in musical comedy, in the title role of My Lady Frayle with Courtice Pounds in 1916.  She appeared in revue alongside Beatrice Lillie in 1922, where she was spotted by Basil Dean and cast in his revival of  Arthur Wing Pinero's 1899 playThe Gay Lord Quex at the Theatre Royal, Drury Lane starring with George Grossmith Jr., in which "she took the house by storm".  In 1925, she appeared in the first London production of No, No, Nanette ("Miss Irene Browne glitters most dangerously").  She soon toured for two years in America.

On her return to Britain, Browne played in Noël Coward's Cavalcade (1931) at Drury Lane and in the Hollywood film adaptation two years later. She continued to be associated with Coward, creating roles in his musicals Conversation Piece (1934), After the Ball (1954) and The Girl Who Came to Supper (1963), and appeared in Blithe Spirit and Relative Values during their long West End runs.

Browne also performed in N.C. Hunter's long-running Waters of the Moon (playing the role created by Edith Evans), co-starring with Sybil Thorndike. She also appeared in plays by Ivor Novello, Dodie Smith, William Wycherley and St. John Hankin.  Browne also played roles in a number of Hollywood films.

Browne died in London of cancer in 1965 at the age of 69.

Filmography

Selected stage roles
 Jane (1947)

Notes

External links

English film actresses
English stage actresses
1896 births
1965 deaths
20th-century English actresses
Actresses from London
Deaths from cancer in England
British expatriate actresses in Australia